The Triftsee is a lake in the Urner Alps near Gadmen in the canton of Berne, Switzerland. It was formed recently (after 2001) by the melting of the lower part of Trift Glacier.

See also
List of mountain lakes of Switzerland

References 

Triftsee story on Swissduc.ch

Lakes of Switzerland
Lakes of the canton of Bern